Travis Cherry is a two-time Grammy-nominated American music producer, musician and songwriter from Raleigh, North Carolina. He has worked with artists such as Bone Thugs and Harmony, Keith Sweat, Jennifer Lopez, Trina, Snoop Dogg, and J. Holiday. His work appears on the Gold-selling album Back of My Lac' by J. Holiday and on Jennifer Lopez's 2007 album Brave. He also appeared on Episode 3 of the first season of BET's TV show Keyshia Cole: The Way It Is.

Education 
Travis Cherry graduated from William G. Enloe GT/IB Center for the Humanities, Sciences, and the Arts in Raleigh, North Carolina. He also attended Louisburg College and St. Augustine's University.

Awards and nominations

Film and TV appearances

2006

Keyshia Cole: The Way It Is -Episode 3 (July 26) – originally aired on BET

2008
Blaque in the House

2009
Split Ends – Episode 1 (August 8) – "Hypnotic" by S0sy – aired on Style Network

2017

Unsung- Case (singer) Episode (February 1) "Heaven" aired on TV One
"Bobbi Kristina" - "Home" by Demetria McKinney aired on TV One (October 8)

2018

"Merry Wish-mas" airing on TV One

2021

"Christmas In My Heart" airing on Hallmark Channel

Discography

2007

J. Holiday – Back of My Lac'
 "Come Here"
 "Bed"  Remix feat Trina And Ja Rule

Jennifer Lopez – Brave (Jennifer Lopez album)Brave
 "Gotta Be There"
 "Gotta Be There" Remix feat J-Bo from the YoungBloodz and Michael Jackson

Bone Thugs-N-Harmony - "Strength And Loyalty"
"Into The Future" (featuring Flesh-n-Bone)

2008

J. Holiday – Back of My Lac''' (Deluxe Edition)====
 "When You Get Home"

====Jason Champion – Reflections====
  "Father You" -credited as Engineer
 album nominated for a Grammy

==== Roy Jones Jr. – "HBO Promo" ====

 "Monsta" feat 3-D -for the Roy Jones JR Vs. Joe Calzhage Fight

==== K. Michelle – unreleased====
 "Can't Go On"

===2009===
====S0sy====
 "Hypnotic"
 -Song featured on Style Network on Split Ends August 8, 2009

==== J. Holiday – Round 2====
 "Wrong Lover" feat Rick Ro$$
 "Make That Sound"
 "Higher"

==== Rick Ro$$ – Def Jam====
 "Illustrious feat Sean Garrett"

===2011===
====Letoya Luckett – Capitol Records====
 "Doing So Good"

===2012===
==== D. Woods – My Favorite Color EP – Woodgrane Ent====
 "Gold Mine"

===2013===
====Jarvis – Cardiology'' – Capitol Records
 "U Need Luv"

2014

Trina - “Rockstarr Royalty”
 “Hottest Chick In The Game”

2015

Raheem Devaughn -"Love Sex Passion"
 "Temperature's Rising"

Case (singer) -"Heaven's Door"
 "Difficult"

2017

Demetria McKinney -"Officially Yours"
 "Kissin" feat Jazze Pha
 "Happy"
 "All Or Nothin"
 "Sextraordinary"
 "Is this Love"
 "Set It Off" feat Demarco
 "Sexualtraordinary Interlude"
 "You Give Good Love"
 "Home" (bonus track) - song featured on Bobbi Kristina movie airing 10/8/17

Case (singer) -"The Love Jones EP Vol 1"
 "Heaven" 
 "Sanctuary"
 "religion"
 "Too Many Nights In LA"

2018

Case (singer) - "Therapy" 
 "Sundress" feat Feedo" (unreleased) 
 "Love Will Do"
 "This Could Be"
 "You feat Slim"
 "Spinnin"
 "Trust feat The Floacist"
 "Religion"
 "2 Many Nights"
 "Heaven"
 "Strawberry"

2019

J. Holiday - “Untitled” 
 ”Petals”

Raheem Devaughn - "The Love Reunion"

"Metronome"

2020

Diamond D featuring Snoop Dogg and Case “Turn It Up”

J. Holiday - Baecation 

 “Whatcha Say”
 “Four”
 “Dem Belly Full”
 “Magic”
 “Baecation”

2021

Demetria McKinney -"untitled"
 "Everything"
 "Take It Slow"
 "Red Cup"
 "Baby Love"
 "Climax"
 "Blame You"
 "Goodbye"
 "Crown"
 "Make It Last"
 "All 4 U"
 "Forever"
 "House Of Payne"
 "London Bridge On Ice"
 "Right Word"
 “Stuck”

J. Holiday - “untitled”

Drip

References

External links 
List of  Travis Cherry Credits on Allmusic.com
List of  Travis Cherry Credits  on Artistdirect.com
North Carolina History Project
CRED Magazine Interview With Travis Cherry
51st Grammy Awards Nominees List
ASCAP Credits
Travis Cherry Interview On Beatfreezer

Living people
1975 births
Louisburg College alumni
Musicians from Raleigh, North Carolina
American hip hop record producers
African-American musicians
African-American record producers
St. Augustine's University (North Carolina) alumni
William G. Enloe High School alumni